Heliomantis is an Asian genus of praying mantids in the family Hymenopodidae, subfamily Hymenopodinae. The genus is monotypic.

Species
The genus contains only one valid species:
 Heliomantis elegans (Navás, 1904) (lectotype: NE India & Nepal; also recorded in Bhutan)

Reassigned
Heliomantis latipennis Werner, 1930 from Sarawak, Borneo, has been transferred to the new genus Werneriana due to its "highly divergent morphology".

Description
Males measure  and females  in total length. Living specimens are predominantly green in color. The head is triangular. The pronotum is moderately lender. The forelegs are typical of praying mantises. The abdomen is wide; the wings far surpass the end of abdomen.

Habitat

References

External links

Mantodea genera
Mantodea of Asia
Insects of Bhutan
Insects of India
Insects of Nepal
Monotypic insect genera
Taxa named by Ermanno Giglio-Tos